Acremma is a genus of moths of the family Erebidae. The genus was erected by Emilio Berio in 1959.

Species
From Africa:
Acremma albipoda Berio, 1959
Acremma chalcochra Hacker, Fiebig & Stadie, 2019
Acremma clatrata Hacker, Fiebig & Stadie, 2019
Acremma funebris (Viette, 1962)
Acremma ingens (Viette, 1988)
Acremma knudlarseni Hacker & Schreier, 2019
Acremma macrophaea Hacker, Fiebig & Stadie, 2019
Acremma neona (Viette, 1962)
Acremma rhodophaea Hacker, Fiebig & Stadie, 2019
Acremma roseocrea (Viette, 1962)
Acremma subindicata (Kenrick, 1917)
Acremma thyridoides (Kenrick, 1917)
Acremma transalbipoda Hacker, Fiebig & Stadie, 2019

References

Boletobiinae
Noctuoidea genera